Warren Harmon Lewis (June 17, 1870 – July 3, 1964) was an American embryologist and cell biologist. He was an elected member of the National Academy of Sciences and the American Philosophical Society. He served as president of the American Association of Anatomists and the International Society for Experimental Cytology, and held honorary memberships in the Royal Microscopical Society in London and Accademia Nazionale dei Lincei in Rome.

References

External links

Warren H. Lewis papers, ca. 1913-1964 at the American Philosophical Society
Kimberly A. Buettner, "Warren Harmon Lewis (1870-1964)", The Embryo Project Encyclopedia.

1870 births
1964 deaths
Cell biologists
American embryologists
People from Suffield, Connecticut
American biologists
Johns Hopkins University alumni
University of Michigan alumni
Members of the United States National Academy of Sciences
Fellows of the Royal Microscopical Society